Tartar was launched at Bermuda in 1775,  possibly under another name. By 1779 she was a privateer sailing out of Liverpool. She captured several prizes, first in the West Indies and then around England. Two French frigates captured her in October 1780.

Career
Some volumes of Lloyd's Register (LR) are not available on line, and some pages are missing from extant volumes. Consequently, Tartar first appeared online in Lloyd's Register for 1779.

On 7 January 1779, Tartar, Captain Allanson, was off Sambrera from where he wrote a letter to her owners. He reported that on 31 October 1778 he had been west of Cape Finistere when he had captured Concorde, Deverger, master, of 500 tons (bm). Concorde, of Bordeaux, had been on her way to Cap François with 2500 barrels of flour, 800 barrels of beef, 200 hogsheads of wine, and more than 20 bales of dry goods, amongst which there were 600 ounces of silver. Allanson took Concorde into Antigua.

On 27 February Captain Allanson captured a large New England brig carrying 380 hogsheads of tobacco. He sent the brig into Antigua.

Next, Tartar, Allanson, master, captured the French slave ship Nairac, Antoine, master, which was coming from Angola with 697 slaves. Tartar also captured Victory, from Nantucket, which was carrying lumber, fish, and oil. Tartar sent both into Kingston, Jamaica. Tartar captured the sloop Hazard, from Providence, and sent her into Antigua.

Tartar, Leyborn, master, of Liverpool, captured a French snow and took her into St Kitts. The snow had been on her way from Guadeloupe to America with a cargo of sugar, rum, and molasses.

On 22 August 1780, Tartar returned to Liverpool, bringing with her a prize, St George, which was carrying a cargo of flax, iron, etc.

Next, Tartar captured a French privateer cutter of 16 guns. The cutter struck after a sharp engagement and Tartar took her into Penzance.

Fate
The Tartar privateer, of Liverpool, Whytell, master, captured a vessel sailing from Ostend to Bordeaux that was carrying 420 hogsheads of tobacco. However, on 29 September two French frigates captured both Tartar and her prize. The French sent their prizes into Rochelle. One of the frigates was under the command of Mon. "Le Vicomte Mortimer".

On her way they captured three British cutters: , of 18 guns, captured 25 September 1780; Tartar, 12 guns; and Jersey, of 12 guns. The French took Alert and Jersey into service.

Notes

Citations

References
 
 
 

1775 ships
Ships built in Bermuda
Privateer ships of Great Britain
Captured ships